The canton of Sedan-2 is an administrative division of the Ardennes department, northern France. It was created at the French canton reorganisation which came into effect in March 2015. Its seat is in Sedan.

It consists of the following communes:

La Chapelle
Fleigneux
Floing
Givonne
Glaire
Illy
Saint-Menges
Sedan (partly)

References

Cantons of Ardennes (department)